There are 12 Grade I listed buildings in Forest Heath, a non-metropolitan district of Suffolk, England.

In the United Kingdom, the term listed building refers to a building or other structure officially designated as being of "exceptional architectural or historic special interest"; Grade I structures are those considered to be "buildings of exceptional interest, sometimes considered to be internationally important. Just 2.5% of listed buildings are Grade I." The total number of listed buildings in England is 372,905. In England, the authority for listing under the Planning (Listed Buildings and Conservation Areas) Act 1990 rests with English Heritage, a non-departmental public body sponsored by the Department for Culture, Media and Sport.

Forest Heath is a local government district, subdivided among 22 civil parishes, including 3 towns, that are in order of population Newmarket, Mildenhall and Brandon. Mildenhall is the administrative headquarters of the district.

Forest Heath

|}

See also
List of Grade I listed buildings in Suffolk
Grade II* listed buildings in Forest Heath

Notes

References

External links

Forest Heath